Abandoned Language is an album by dälek, released by Ipecac Recordings in 2007.

Track listing

Personnel 
 MC Dälek – lead vocals, producer
 Oktopus – producer

References

Ipecac Recordings albums
2007 albums
Dälek albums